Louise Contamine (27 January 1905 – 1988) was a Belgian figure skater. She competed in the pairs event at the 1936 Winter Olympics.

References

External links
 

1905 births
1988 deaths
Belgian female pair skaters
Olympic figure skaters of Belgium
Figure skaters at the 1936 Winter Olympics
Sportspeople from Antwerp